The 1965 Air Force Falcons football team represented the United States Air Force Academy as an independent during the 1965 NCAA University Division football season. Led by eighth-year head coach Ben Martin, the Falcons compiled a record of 3–6–1 and outscored their opponents 166–156. Air Force played their home games at Falcon Stadium in Colorado Springs, Colorado.

Schedule

References

Air Force
Air Force Falcons football seasons
Air Force Falcons football